The 406th Support Brigade is a support brigade of the United States Army.

The 406th Army Field Support Battalion-Bragg is a sub-unit of  406th Army Field Support Brigade

External links
406th Support Brigade at the Institute of Heraldry

Support 406